Guanchezia is a genus of terrestrial orchids. There is only one known species, Guanchezia maguirei, endemic to Venezuela.

References

External links
IOSPE orchid photos

Monotypic Epidendroideae genera
Orchids of Venezuela
Maxillariinae
Maxillariinae genera